The Bergin Hunt and Fish Club that was located at 98-04 101st Avenue in Ozone Park was a former Gambino crime family hangout.

Today
After its days as a mob social club, the location has been separated into two storefronts. Many current residents of the area have never heard of the Gambino family or any of their members. Since 1990, incidents of various types of crime in the neighborhood have significantly reduced, which may correlate with the overall decrease in crime in New York City.

References

 

Clubhouses in Queens, New York

Gambino crime family